The General Catalogue of Variable Stars (GCVS) is a list of variable stars.   Its first edition, containing 10,820 stars, was published in 1948 by the Academy of Sciences of the USSR and edited by B. V. Kukarkin and P. P. Parenago. Second and third editions were published in 1958 and 1968; the fourth edition, in three volumes, was published 1985–1987.  It contained 28,435 stars.  A fourth volume of the fourth edition containing reference tables was later published, as well as a fifth volume containing variable stars outside the Galaxy.  The last edition (GCVS v5.1) based on data compiled in 2015 gathers 52,011 variable stars.

The most up-to-date version of the GCVS is available at the GCVS website.  It contains improved coordinates for the variable stars in the printed fourth edition of the GCVS, as well as variable stars discovered too recently to be included in the fourth edition.  An older version of the GCVS dating from 2004 is available from the VizieR service at the Centre de Données astronomiques de Strasbourg under the name Combined General Catalog of Variable Stars (GCVS4.2; VizieR database number II/250).

References

External links
 GCVS website
 Combined General Catalog of Variable Stars (GCVS4.2), 2004 version of the GCVS, at the Centre de Données astronomiques de Strasbourg.

Astronomical catalogues of stars
Variable stars

lb:USNO CCD Astrograph Catalog